Platform 1 is a men's mental health charity based in Huddersfield, England. It is situated near Huddersfield railway station.

History
The charity was started in April 2018 by Bob Morse, who has had depression and suicidal thoughts in the past, and Gez Walsh.

In 2020, the charity was announced as one of the winners of the Department for Transport's Transform a Pacer competition. It received a Class 144 unit on 10 July 2021. It plans to convert the former train carriage into a kitchen.

Work
Platform 1 aims to reduce loneliness by providing a meeting space, support, and community. Activities include bicycle repair.

References

External links 

 Official website

Mental health organisations in the United Kingdom
Charities based in England